{{DISPLAYTITLE:C29H38O3}}
The molecular formula C29H38O3 (molar mass: 434.61 g/mol) may refer to:

 Oxogestone phenpropionate (OPP)
 Testosterone phenylbutyrate, also known as testosterone phenylbutanoate

Molecular formulas